is a Japanese television drama series based on the humorous mystery novel by Yoshi Nanao. It premiered on NTV on 11 April 2015, starring Mikako Tabe and Tadayoshi Okura in the lead role. It received the viewership rating of 9.3% on average.

Cast
 Mikako Tabe as Maya Kuroi, a detective sergeant
 Tadayoshi Okura as Shūsuke Daikanyama, a detective constable and Maya's colleague
 Yō Yoshida as Fujiko Shirogane, a detective superintendent and Maya's confronting supervisor
 Hikaru Yaotome as Sōichirō Hamada, a detective constable who wants to be abused by Maya
 Yasuhi Nakamura as Masanobu Nakane, a detective constable
 Masanobu Katsumura as Tsuneo Arisugawa, a detective inspector
 Masatō Ibu as Tokuji Kondō, a veteran detective sergeant

Episodes

References

External links
  
 
  
 

Japanese drama television series
2015 in Japanese television
2015 Japanese television series debuts
2015 Japanese television series endings
Nippon TV dramas
Television shows based on Japanese novels